Gamboma  is a district in the Plateaux Region of eastern Republic of the Congo. The capital lies at Gamboma.

Towns and villages

References

Plateaux Department (Republic of the Congo)
Districts of the Republic of the Congo